Cape Levvel is a peninsula in Qikiqtaaluk Region, Nunavut, Canada. It is located on Amund Ringnes Island by Strand Bay.

References
 Atlas of Canada

Peninsulas of Qikiqtaaluk Region
Sverdrup Islands